Sofie Clarice Dossi (born June 21, 2001) is an American contortionist and YouTuber. In 2016, she rose to fame on the eleventh season of America's Got Talent. , her YouTube channel has 8.4 million subscribers and 1.5 billion views.

Life and career

Dossi grew up in the city of Cypress in southern California. She was homeschooled from a young age by her mother, Abir. Her father, Mike, has helped with her career by designing props and roadying, and her older brother, Zak, produces and appears in her YouTube videos. Her mother's side is of Arab descent, her father's of Italian.

As a child, Dossi took gymnastics and dance lessons and learned classical piano. When she found that she was able to flex similarly to the contortionist in a Cirque du Soleil video, she began at age 12 to teach herself contortion by emulating poses that she found on YouTube and inventing new poses. She soon performed at gatherings for friends and family and eventually was hired for larger events. Despite frequent online speculation, Dossi does not lack a spine.

In 2016, America's Got Talent featured Dossi, then 14, on the show's eleventh season, where she performed various feats of flexibility, strength, and dexterity. Her first performance included shooting a bow and arrow with her feet while doing a handstand. After another performance that featured an aerial hoop routine and shooting a flaming arrow from a bow with her feet, guest judge Reba McEntire awarded her the "Golden Buzzer". In the season finals, she did another routine with handstand tricks and an aerial hoop but did not make the cut for the last five. She returned to the series in 2019 for the first season of AGT: The Champions.

Dossi uploaded the first video to her YouTube channel in late 2016 and continues to post weekly. , her channel has accumulated over 8 million subscribers and over 1.5 billion views. For her YouTube work, she has been nominated for several Streamy Awards.

In acting, Dossi had cameos on Disney Channel's Bizaardvark and K.C. Undercover and starred on the Brat TV show Boss Cheer (2018–2019). Dossi ventured into pop music with the release of her debut single, "Bunny", on August 19, 2022. She co-wrote this breakup song with her brother, Zak, who directed the music video.

References

External links

Living people
2001 births
American people of Arab descent
American people of Italian descent
People from Cypress, California
Contortionists
America's Got Talent contestants
YouTubers from California
21st-century American dancers
Dancers from California
21st-century American actresses
Actresses from California
21st-century American women singers
Singer-songwriters from California